Going Seventeen (also known as GoSe) is a South Korean variety web series starring boy band Seventeen. The series has been offered for free viewing on YouTube and V Live (then later, on Weverse) since its premiere on June 12, 2017. It features the band members participating in a variety of activities depending on an episode's main concept, ranging from games or completing challenges to skits, role playing and get-togethers.

The show started primarily with a video blog / behind-the-scenes format in its first seasons, featuring the band's various activities across their career with intermittent variety-type episodes. In 2019, it formally transitioned to the variety show format, and it aired weekly on Mondays at 10:10 p.m. (22:10) KST since January 2020. It began airing on Wednesdays at 21:00 KST since the start of its fifth season in April 2021. Throughout its broadcast history, the show garnered positive reviews for providing quality content that can be enjoyed by anyone in and outside the band's fandom, with cumulative views exceeding 270 million as of January 2022.

Cast

Main 

Seventeen
 Choi Seung-cheol (S.Coups)
 Yoon Jeong-han (Jeonghan)
 Joshua Jisoo Hong (Joshua)
 Wen Junhui (Jun)
 Kwon Soon-young (Hoshi)
 Jeon Won-woo (Wonwoo)
 Lee Ji-hoon (Woozi)
 Lee Seok-min (DK)
 Kim Min-gyu (Mingyu)
 Xu Minghao (The8)
 Boo Seung-kwan (Seungkwan)
 Hansol Vernon Chwe (Vernon)
 Lee Chan (Dino)

Special appearance 

 Going Seventeen production team
 Headed by director Kim Hyun-seok and producer Lee Eun-song, members of the Going Seventeen production team made a special appearance in Episodes 42–43: "Going vs. Seventeen" of Going Seventeen 2020, the first ever instance of such participation in the show.
 Relatives of the members of Seventeen
 A few relatives of some members of Seventeen made special appearances in the show. They include Hoshi's parents and Dino's grandmother in Episodes 36–37: "How to Eat Rice the Perfect Way" of Going Seventeen 2021–2022.
 Park Mun-ki
 a referee from the Korea Council of Sport for All (KOCOSA) who was a regular cast member in the 2005–2018 MBC reality show Infinite Challenge, in which he participated as the show's official referee. Park appeared in Episode 39: "Infinite Going" (Part 2) of Going Seventeen 2021–2022.
 Lee Eun-jae (Jaejae)
 television producer and presenter who is the host of the SBS variety web series MMTG. Lee appeared and cohosted in a special collaborative episode between Going Seventeen and MMTG.

Series overview

Episodes

Going Seventeen 2017 
All episodes in this season except for the final episode (Episode 29) are in video blog / behind-the-scenes format, featuring Seventeen's various activities across their career. Episode 29 is in a talk show format.

Going Seventeen Spin-off (2018) 
The episodes in this season are in video blog format unless noted otherwise.
{{Episode table|background=#CDB5CC|overall=7|season=7|airdate=|aux1=|aux2=|aux3=|aux1T=Title|aux2T=MC|aux3T=Teams|episodes=

{{Episode list
| EpisodeNumber       = 34
| EpisodeNumber2      = 5
| Aux1                = "Episode 5"
| Aux2                = —
| Aux3                = —
| OriginalAirDate     = 
| ShortSummary        = The making and promotions of Seventeen sub-unit BooSeokSoons single Just Do It
| LineColor           = #CDB5CC
}}

}}

 Going Seventeen 2019 
This season marks Going Seventeen'''s change of format, transitioning from video blog (Episodes 1, 2, 5, 8, 9, 12 and 13) to variety show (Episodes 3, 4, 6, 7, 10, 11, 14 and onwards). It is also in this season when the show first used its opening and ending theme songs.

 Going Seventeen 2020 
This season consists of episodes that are part of Seventeen's "Monthly Seventeen" project (from Going Seventeen 2019's Eps. 27-28: "The Secret Life of Going Sevong"), wherein each member contributes an episode concept that will be featured per month within the season's period.
{{Episode table|background=lightpink|overall=7|season=7|airdate=|aux1=|aux2=|aux3=|aux1T=Title|aux2T=Host|aux3T=Teams|episodes=

{{Episode list
| EpisodeNumber       = 125
| EpisodeNumber2      = 44
| Aux1                = "TTT (Hyperrealism Ver.)" (Part 1)
| Aux2                = —
| Aux3                = —
| OriginalAirDate     = 
| ShortSummary        = In Going Seventeens third "TTT", Seventeen enjoys the company of each other in an unscripted, "hyperrealistic" year-end MT.
| LineColor           = lightpink
}}
{{Episode list
| EpisodeNumber       = 126
| EpisodeNumber2      = 45
| Aux1                = "TTT (Hyperrealism Ver.)" (Part 2)
| Aux2                = —
| Aux3                = —
| OriginalAirDate     = 
| ShortSummary        = In Going Seventeen's third "TTT", Seventeen enjoys the company of each other in an unscripted, "hyperrealistic" year-end MT.
| LineColor           = lightpink
}}

}}

 Going Seventeen 2021–2023 
{{Episode table|background=#404250|overall=7|season=7|airdate=|aux1=|aux2=|aux3=|aux1T=Title|aux2T=MC|aux3T=Teams|episodes=

{{Episode list
| EpisodeNumber       = 135
| EpisodeNumber2      = 7
| Aux1                = "Treasure Island: 13 Raiders" (Part 1)
| Aux2                = —
| Aux3                = —
| OriginalAirDate     = {{efn|name=13Raiders2|"Treasure Island: 13 Raiders" pts. 1 and 2 were pre-released on JTBC2 on May 27, 2021 and June 3, 2021, respectively. This led to the two episodes being released on Going Seventeen's major platforms (YouTube, VLive and Weverse) a week later than the regular schedule.}}
| ShortSummary        = In an island, Seventeen engages in a treasure hunt game while finding the missing pieces of the map that will lead them to the prize.
| LineColor           = #404250
}}

}}

 Soundtrack 
The soundtrack of Going Seventeen includes the show's opening and ending theme songs which are both composed by Seventeen band members Woozi, Jeonghan, Hoshi, DK and Seungkwan. Both are performed by the entire band and debuted on 17 June 2019 in the eighth episode of Going Seventeen 2019.

The production of the opening theme song (and its corresponding title sequence for the season) and the ending theme song were documented and featured in the sixth and seventh episodes of Going Seventeen 2019. In Episode 6: "Making the Going Seventeen Opening Song" (aired 20 May 2019), it was revealed that Woozi pre-produced four instrumentals and let his co-composers choose which among them will be fitting to be the opening and ending theme music. The composers then wrote the lyrics and recorded demo versions of the songs, with Woozi handling the production. Later, the entire band unanimously approved the songs and discussed the production of the songs' final versions and the filming of the show's title sequence. The behind-the-scenes of the recording of the songs and the filming of the title sequence are featured in Episode 7: "Making the Going Seventeen Opening Video" (aired 3 June 2019).

 Reception 
Television 
On April 1, 2021, South Korean cable television network JTBC announced a 10-week long Spring special programming block of content from Hybe Labels artists. Going Seventeen was included in the lineup for Seventeen. In addition, two new episodes from the series, 'Treasure Island: 13 Raiders', premiered on television first, and later on YouTube and Weverse.

Accolades Going Seventeen has been praised for being content that can be enjoyed by anyone regardless of generation, nationality, and fandom. It breaks the notion of 'K-pop content enjoyed only by fans' and is expanding the audience enough to build a fandom of its own. The show has often been labeled 'National Web Variety Show' and even 'K-pop's Infinite Challenge' by various media outlets. 

As of January 2022, Going Seventeen'' surpassed 270 million cumulative views with just two seasons in 2020 and 2021, and averaged over 3.62 million and 2.44 million views per episode, respectively.

Notes

References 

Seventeen (South Korean band)
South Korean web series
South Korean variety television shows